An ibex (plural ibex, ibexes or ibices) is any of several species of wild goat (genus Capra), distinguished by the male's large recurved horns, which are transversely ridged in front. Ibex are found in Eurasia, North Africa and East Africa. The name ibex comes from Latin, borrowed from Iberian or Aquitanian, akin to Old Spanish bezerro "bull", modern Spanish becerro "yearling". Two closely related varieties of goats found in the wild are not usually called ibex: the markhor and the feral goat.

A male ibex is referred to as a buck, a female is a doe, and young juveniles are called kids. An ibex buck is commonly larger and heavier than a doe. The most noticeable difference between the sexes is the larger size of a buck's horns. The doe grows a pair of smaller, thinner horns which develop considerably more slowly than those of a buck. The ibex's horns appear at birth and continue to grow through the rest of its life. Species of wild goats that are called ibex are:

 The Alpine Ibex (Capra ibex) is found in the European Alps. Alpine ibex are found in France, Bulgaria, Austria, Switzerland, Italy, Germany and Slovenia, and have been introduced to ranches in the United States, Canada and Argentina.
 The Nubian ibex (Capra nubiana) occurs in the Middle East, in the Red Sea hills of Sudan as well as the highlands in Egypt. 
 The Walia or Ethiopian ibex (Capra walie) is found in the Semien Mountains of the Ethiopian Highlands, where it has recently been upgraded from critically endangered to endangered. It is sometimes considered a subspecies of Alpine Ibex. The Ibex was also a national emblem of the Axumite Empire.
 The Spanish or Iberian ibex (Capra pyrenaica) is now restricted to mountainous enclaves of the Iberian Peninsula south of the Pyrenees, but in the past it also occurred in the Pyrenees and southern France. There are approximately 50,000 Spanish ibex on the Iberian Peninsula. Two of its subspecies went extinct, although one, the Pyrenean Ibex, was cloned in 2003. 
 The Asiatic or Siberian ibex (Capra sibirica) is a wild goat inhabiting long mountain systems in central Asian deserts and the northwestern Himalayas. The animal is 80–100 cm high at shoulder, and weighs an average 60 kg. The adult males have long pointed beards and scimitar-shaped horns with prominent ridges on the frontal surface. The coat is dark brown with greyish underparts, and a dorsal stripe runs from the neck to tail. Adult males also have grey saddle patches on their backs. The species exhibits sexual dimorphism, as the females are smaller with small straight horns that are widely separated at the base. Asiatic ibex is widely distributed over an area stretching from the Hindu-Kush Mountains in Afghanistan to Sayan Mountains in Mongolia. The animals are found most frequently at elevations ranging from 3000 to 5300 m above sea level, but are also known to occur in areas as low as 1000 m in the Altai Mountains. They have a predilection for rugged terrain as an anti-predator strategy. 
The wild goat (Capra aegagrus), also known as West Asian ibex, is found in  Turkey and the Caucasus in the west to Turkmenistan, Afghanistan and Pakistan in the east, and is the ancestor of the domestic goat.

History
Evidence of the ibex is widely present in the archaeological record, particularly in the Near East and Mediterranean regions. Ibex motifs are very common on cylinder seals and pottery, both painted and embossed.
From the similar age a gold jewelry ibex image was found at the Akrotiri archaeological site on Santorini in present day Greece.

An Iron Age Capra ibex specimen was recovered at the Aq Kupruk Archaeological site in present day Afghanistan, illustrating either domestication or hunting of the ibex by these early peoples. However, archaeological records of ibex can be difficult to separate from those of domestic goats.
 
Earlier evidence of domestication or hunting of the ibex was found identified through DNA analysis of the contents of the stomach of Ötzi, the natural mummy of a  Chalcolithic man discovered in the  Ötztal Alps in 1991, who lived between 3400 and 3100 BCE.  According to DNA reconstruction, the man's penultimate meal contained ibex. There is a myth that says Ibex used to have wings in a time and they used to fly back in dates, by time their wings disappeared and they started climbing the mountain.

In Yemen, the ibex is a longstanding symbol of national identity, representing many positive attributes of the Yemeni people. Numbers of the animal – primarily the Nubian ibex – declined significantly from the late 20th century, due to hunting. In 2022, activists and intellectuals urged the declaration of an annual National Ibex Day, on 22 January, along with calls for greater protection of the animal.

Rescue from extinction 
When firearms spread in the 15th century, the large population of ibex that spanned many of Europe's mountains decreased as they became easy targets for hunters. The ibex was often hunted for its meat, with other body parts used for medicine. The ibex horns were highly sought-after as a remedy for impotence, while its blood was used for treating kidney stones. 

The relentless hunting of the ibex might have led to its extinction were it not for the foresight of the dukes of Savoy. Charles-Felix, Duke of Savoy and King of Sardinia, banned the hunting of the ibex across his estates of the Gran Paradiso after being persuaded by a report on the animal's endangered state. The ban was implemented on 12 September 1821 and its law was soon extended to the rest of the kingdom. In 1856, Victor Emmanuel II, succeeding Charles-Felix as the king, inducted the Gran Paradiso as a protected hunting estate along with appointed gamekeepers to patrol the area.

Footnotes

References
 Francke, A. H. (1914). Antiquities of Indian Tibet. Two Volumes. Calcutta. 1972 reprint: S. Chand, New Delhi.

External links
 

Capra (genus)
Goats
Mammals of Asia
Mammals of Africa
Mammal common names

bg:Алпийски козирог
es:Capra
eo:Ibekso
he:יעל
mk:Козорог
pt:Ibex dos Alpes
sl:Alpski kozorog
sr:Кozorog
sv:Stenbock (däggdjur)